The bile acid receptor (BAR), also known as farnesoid X receptor (FXR) or NR1H4 (nuclear receptor subfamily 1, group H, member 4), is a nuclear receptor that is encoded by the NR1H4 gene  in humans.

Function 
FXR is expressed at high levels in the liver and intestine.  Chenodeoxycholic acid and other bile acids are natural ligands for FXR. Similar to other nuclear receptors, when activated, FXR translocates to the cell nucleus, forms a dimer (in this case a heterodimer with RXR) and binds to hormone response elements on DNA, which up- or down-regulates the expression of certain genes.

One of the primary functions of FXR activation is the suppression of cholesterol 7 alpha-hydroxylase (CYP7A1), the rate-limiting enzyme in bile acid synthesis from cholesterol.  FXR does not directly bind to the CYP7A1 promoter.  Rather, FXR induces expression of small heterodimer partner (SHP), which then functions to inhibit transcription of the CYP7A1 gene. In this way, a negative feedback pathway is established in which synthesis of bile acids is inhibited when cellular levels are already high.

FXR has also been found to be important in regulation of hepatic triglyceride levels. Specifically, FXR activation suppresses lipogenesis and promotes free fatty acid oxidation by PPARα activation.  Studies have also shown the FXR to regulate the expression and activity of epithelial transport proteins involved in fluid homeostasis in the intestine, such as the cystic fibrosis transmembrane conductance regulator (CFTR).

Activation of FXR in diabetic mice reduces plasma glucose and improves insulin sensitivity, whereas inactivation of FXR has the opposite effect.

Interactions 
Farnesoid X receptor has been shown to interact with:
 Peroxisome proliferator-activated receptor gamma coactivator 1-alpha  and
 Retinoid X receptor alpha.

Ligands 
A number of ligands for FXR are known, of both natural and synthetic origin.

Agonists
 Cafestol
 Chenodeoxycholic acid
 Fexaramine
 GW 4064
 Ivermectin
 Obeticholic acid
 Tropifexor 
Antagonists
 Guggulsterone

References

Further reading

External links 
 
 

g2
Transcription factors